Joel Compass is British R&B and soul singer/producer. He is best known for his debut EP Astronaut, his debut single "Run", and the singles Forgive Me" and Girlfriends.

Post release, Compass dived into production working with the likes of FKA Twigs, Jorja Smith, Mabel, Aqualung, Tinashe and Lion Babe.

On 20 August 2020, Compass announced he would be returning to music as a recording artist and released a new single titled "Hypocrite".

Discography

Extended plays

Mixtapes

Singles

Featured singles

Collaborations 
 Rudimental – "Baby" featuring Joel Compass, MNEK and Sinead Harnett ( Live at BBC Maida Vale 2012 )
 Last Night In Paris – "So Very" featuring Joel Compass ( Roses+ 2013 )
 Woz – "Early Morning Champagne" featuring Joel Compass ( Early Morning Champagne – EP 2013 )
 Gorgon City – "Here For You (Joel Compass Remix)" ( Here For You ft. Laura Welsh Remixes – EP 2014 )
 FKA twigs – "Kicks" ( LP1 2014 )
 Aqualung – "Tape 2 Tape" featuring Joel Compass ( 10 Futures 2015 )
 Cheryl – "Coming Up For Air" featuring Joel Compass ( Only Human 2014 )
 LuvBug – "Revive (Say Something) (Original)" featuring Joel Compass ( 2015 )
 MO – "Preach" ( 2015 )
 Laura Welsh – "Soft Control" ( Soft Control 2015 )
 LION BABE – "Wonder Woman (Joel Compass Remix)" ( Wonder Woman Remixes – EP 2015 )
 FKA twigs – "In Time" ( M3LL155X 2015 )
 Soultech – "Collide" featuring Joel Compass ( 2015 )
 Charlene Soraia – "I'll Be There" ( Love Is The Law 2015 )
 Seal – "Monascow" ( 7 2015 )
 Songbirds – "Sun Goes Down" ( Music from and inspired by the film Kill Your Friends 2015 )
 LION BABE – "Whole", "Impossible", "On The Rocks" ( Begin 2016 )
 Rejjie Snow – "Keep Your Head Up" featuring Joel Compass ( 2016 )
 LION BABE – "Endless Summer", "Tina Turner", "Silver Cheetah" ( Sun Joint 2016 )
 Tinashe – "Touch Pass" ( Nightride 2016 )
 Shift K3Y – "Forever" ( NIT3 TALES 2016 )
 Beverley Knight – "Marvellous Party" ( The Halcyon Original Music from the Television Series 2017 )
 Jamie Cullum – "Forever", "Invincible" ( The Halcyon Original Music from the Television Series 2017 )
 Henri – "Sunshine Of Your Love" ( 2017 )
 Mabel – "Weapon" ( Ivy to Roses 2017 )
 Tinashe – "Fires And Flames" ( Joyride 2018 )
 Queen Naija – "Bad Boy" ( Queen Naija 2018 )
 Jorja Smith – "On Your Own", "The One" ( Lost & Found 2018 )
 Snoh Aalegra – "You" ( Ugh, Those Feels Again 2019 )
 Jorja Smith – "Addicted", "Digging", "Weekend" (Be Right Back 2021)

References 

Living people
English soul singers
Singers from London
Year of birth missing (living people)